Daniel Spader Voorhees Jr. (August 15, 1852 – August 12, 1935) was the New Jersey State Treasurer from 1907 to 1913. He was the superintendent of Greystone Park Psychiatric Hospital.

Biography
He was born on August 15, 1852 in Somerville, New Jersey to Daniel Spader Voorhees, Sr. and Mary Louise Compton Doty.

On January 18, 1874 he married Frances L. White (born January 18, 1856). She was the daughter of Margaret and William W. White of New Brunswick, New Jersey.

In 1898 he was elected county clerk of Morris County. The New Jersey Senate convened on February 14, 1907 and appointed him as the New Jersey State Treasurer for a term of three years, to succeed Frank Obadiah Briggs. He started his term on March 1, 1907, and in 1910 was re-elected and served until 1913. He was succeeded by Edward Everett Grosscup.

He died on August 12, 1935 in Morristown, New Jersey.

References

1852 births
1935 deaths
New Jersey Republicans
People from Morristown, New Jersey
Politicians from Somerville, New Jersey
State treasurers of New Jersey